Grange Lane railway station may refer to:

In the United Kingdom
 Birkenhead Grange Lane railway station, in Birkenhead, Merseyside, England
 Grange Lane railway station (South Yorkshire), in Sheffield, England

Elsewhere
 Grange Lane railway station, Jamaica